Wag generally refers to tail wagging by dogs.

Wag, Wags, WAG or WAGS may also refer to:

Arts and entertainment 

 Wag (band), a Japanese rock music group, active 1998–2006
 Wag, a character in Kabumpo in Oz (1922)
 Wags the Dog, a mascot in the Australian children's band The Wiggles
 WAGS (TV series), an American reality TV series
 Winnipeg Art Gallery, in Manitoba, Canada
 Women's Art Group, precursor to the Women's Art Movement in Adelaide, South Australia, 1974

Businesses based in the United States

 Wag (brand), a dog food brand by Amazon
 Wag (company), or Wag!, a pet care company
 Wag's, a defunct restaurant chain
 Wag-Aero, an aircraft manufacturer
 WAGS (AM), a defunct radio station
 Warner Animation Group, a corporate division of Warner Bros.

Language 

 WAGs, a British slang/journalese acronym for 'wives and girlfriends'
 Wild-Ass Guess, American slang for 'a rough estimate by an expert'
 Taupota language, an Oceanic dialect continuum (ISO 639-3 code: wag)
 Wagging, school truancy, in Commonwealth English slang

People with the nickname
 Charles R. Harding (born ), English professional rower
 Charlie Keetley (1906–1979), English footballer
 Fred Waghorne ( "Old Wag"; 1865–1956), Canadian ice hockey referee
 Leon Wagner ("Daddy Wags"; 1934–2004), American baseball player
 WAG Pinto (1924–2021), Indian Army general

Places 

 Váh (Polish: Wag), a Slovak tributary of the Danube river
 Wag Islands, Nunavut, Canada
 Wag Province, Amhara Region, Ethiopia

Sport 

 WAGs, slang acronym for 'wives and girlfriends' (of footballers and other sportsmen)
 West Asian Games, a defunct quadrennial event
 Women's artistic gymnastics, a sport
 World Air Games, an international air sports event

Transportation 
 Wellsville, Addison and Galeton Railroad, Pennsylvania and New York (reporting mark:  WAG)
 Whanganui Airport, New Zealand (IATA code: WAG)
 Wide AC goods, a classification of Indian locomotives

See also